Winston Alanzo Gordon (born 9 November 1976) is a former British judoka, who competed at three Olympic Games.

Biography
Gordon was born in Lambeth, London. He came to prominence when becoming champion of Great Britain, winning the middleweight division at the British Judo Championships in 1996. After representing Great Britain at two European Championships he won a second British title in 2000, at the heavier middleweight class of -90kg.

At the 2002 Commonwealth Games in Manchester, he won the gold medal in the under 90kg category. In 2004, he was selected to represent Great Britain at the 2004 Summer Olympics, competing in the men's 90kg he just missed out on winning the bronze medal when he lost to Mark Huizinga in the play off. The following year he won his third British title, this time at half-heavyweight.

In 2006, he won the bronze medal at the 2006 European Judo Championships in Tampere, before gaining selection for a second Olympic Games in 2008. At the games he competed in the men's 90kg class. After winning the 2009 British Open he participated in his third Olympic Games, this time at his 2012 home games in London.

He retired in 2013.

Personal life
He is a Sensei at the EB Phoenix Judo Club in Tooting, London.

Achievements

References

External links
 
 
 

1976 births
Living people
English male judoka
Judoka at the 2004 Summer Olympics
Judoka at the 2008 Summer Olympics
Judoka at the 2012 Summer Olympics
Olympic judoka of Great Britain
Commonwealth Games gold medallists for England
Judoka at the 2002 Commonwealth Games
Black British sportspeople
People educated at Ernest Bevin College
Commonwealth Games medallists in judo
Medallists at the 2002 Commonwealth Games